"Way of the World" is a song by American singer and actress Tina Turner from her 1991 compilation album, Simply the Best. One of four new songs recorded for the album, it became a top-20 hit in several European countries, including reaching number 12 in both Austria and Ireland and number 13 in the United Kingdom. Although it did not chart in the United States, it peaked at number 70 in Canada.

Track listings
7-inch single
 "Way of the World" — 4:22
 "I Don't Wanna Lose You" — 4:16

Maxi-CD and 12-inch maxi
 "Way of the World" — 4:22
 "I Don't Wanna Lose You" — 4:16
 "Foreign Affair"

Charts

Weekly charts

Year-end charts

References

Tina Turner songs
1991 singles
Songs written by Albert Hammond
Songs written by Graham Lyle
Music videos directed by Herb Ritts
1991 songs
Capitol Records singles